State Route 147 (SR 147) is a state highway in the U.S. state of California. The route runs along the eastern side of Lake Almanor.  It serves as a bypass to connect State Route 89 and State Route 36 on the eastern side of the lake, whereas the two highways already meet on the western side in Chester.

Route description
The route begins at State Route 89 in Canyondam. As it continues through Plumas County, it intersects County Route A13 before exiting the county. It then enters Lassen County where it intersects County Route A21 before meeting its north end at State Route 36.

SR 147 is not part of the National Highway System, a network of highways that are considered essential to the country's economy, defense, and mobility by the Federal Highway Administration.

SR 147 is part of the Volcanic Legacy Scenic Byway, an All-American Road, that circles Lake Almanor.

Major intersections

See also

References

External links

California Highways: Route 147
California @ AARoads.com - State Route 147
Caltrans: Route 147 highway conditions

147
State Route 147
State Route 147